Bartosz Karwan (born 13 January 1976) is a Polish former footballer who played as a midfielder.

Club career
Karwan was born in Tychy.

He spent two seasons in the Bundesliga with Hertha BSC.

In September 2010, he joined GKS Katowice. He was released one year later.

International career
Karwan was a part of Poland national football team, for which he appeared 22 times and scored four goals.

Honours
 DFB-Ligapokal: 2002
 Ekstraklasa: 2001–02, 2005–06
 Polish SuperCup: 1995, 1997

References

External links
 
 

Living people
1976 births
People from Tychy
Sportspeople from Silesian Voivodeship
Association football midfielders
Polish footballers
Poland international footballers
GKS Katowice players
R.S.C. Anderlecht players
Legia Warsaw players
Hertha BSC players
Arka Gdynia players
Bundesliga players